Sadık Çiftpinar (born 1 January 1993) is a Turkish footballer who plays as a defender for Kasımpaşa.

Professional career
Çiftpinar joined Yeni Malatyaspor in 2015 and helped them through two successful promotions from the TFF Second League into the Süper Lig. Çiftpinar made his professional debut for Yeni Malatyaspor in a 4–2 Süper Lig win over Kardemir Karabükspor on 24 September 2017.

He joined Fenerbahçe on a 3.5+1 contract on 5 January 2019.

Controversy 
In Yeni Malatyaspor's match with Kasımpaşa, Çiftpınar wanted to leave the game after being booed for signalling his genitalia to the crowd following his mistake in his club's second goal conceded. After the event, he was left out of the squad for an indefinite amount of time.

In the summer of 2022, Çiftpınar signed with Kasımpaşa.

References

External links

Yeni Malatyaspor Profile

1993 births
People from Seyhan
Living people
Turkish footballers
Turkey youth international footballers
Association football defenders
Yeni Malatyaspor footballers
Fenerbahçe S.K. footballers
Kasımpaşa S.K. footballers
Süper Lig players
TFF First League players
TFF Second League players
TFF Third League players